The Medical Campus of Philadelphia occupies the site on which the world’s first medical school for women, the Woman's Medical College of Pennsylvania (1850–1867), relocated from Center City to East Falls in 1930.   Subsequent name changes included The Woman's Medical College of Pennsylvania (1867–1970) and The Medical College of Pennsylvania (1970–1995).  As of 2014, it is named, the Drexel University College of Medicine: Queen Lane Medical Campus.

The Medical Campus of Philadelphia is a hub for medical activity in East Falls and accommodates medical, educational, biotechnology and life science uses.

Drexel University
Buildings and structures in Philadelphia
1930 establishments in Pennsylvania